Robert Kościecha (born 22 November 1977 in Toruń, Poland) is a Polish speedway rider has won 2005 European Pairs Speedway Champion title.

His father Roman (2 August 1949 - 6 June 2009) was also a speedway rider. He has a sister called Agnieszka.

Robert was also team-captain for his Swedish team Piraterna in 2009.

Career details

World Championships 
 Individual U-21 World Championship
 1998 - 11th place (5 points)

European Championships 
 Individual European Championship
 2006 - 13th (4 points)
 European Pairs Championship
 2004 - 3rd place (6 points)
 2005 - European Champion (12 points)
 2007 - 1st place in Semi-Final (3 points)
 European Club Champions' Cup
 2009 -  Toruń - Runner-up (7 pts) Toruń

Domestic competitions 
 Individual Polish Championship
 2004 - 4th place
 2009 - 17th place in Semi-Final 2
 Team Polish Championship
 2001 - Polish Champion

See also 

 Poland national speedway team

References 

1977 births
Living people
Polish speedway riders
European Pairs Speedway Champions
Polonia Bydgoszcz riders